The North Euston Hotel is a hotel in Fleetwood, Lancashire, England. It was built 1840–41, to a design by Decimus Burton. During the second half of the 19th century, the building was used by the War Department as a School of Musketry; by the end of the century it had reverted to its original purpose. The hotel has been designated a Grade II listed building by English Heritage.

History
Fleetwood was a 19th-century planned town, developed by local landowner Peter Hesketh-Fleetwood. Inspired by southern English seaside resorts like St Leonards-on-Sea, Hesketh-Fleetwood employed architect Decimus Burton to lay out his new town and design the main buildings. Hesketh-Fleetwood intended that Fleetwood would be an important stop for rail passengers travelling from London to Scotland; in the 1840s, there was no railway over the Lake District hills and passengers would be able to disembark at Fleetwood before taking a boat to Scotland. A hotel was a vital part of this plan and since rail passengers would be embarking at London Euston, Hesketh-Fleetwood decided to name it the North Euston Hotel.

Burton designed the hotel as a focal point in the town. Construction started in 1840 and it opened the following year. A regatta was held in celebration of the hotel's opening in August 1841. The hotel's first manager was a Corsican man called Xenon Vantini. By the 1850s, a direct rail route to Scotland had been built, ending Hesketh-Fleetwood's hopes of Fleetwood becoming a major transport hub. The town's tourist industry was failing and the North Euston was sold to the government. From 1861–1867 the War Department used it as a School of Musketry. Later, with additional buildings, it was converted into Euston Barracks. In 1898 the North Euston reverted to its original purpose.

On 26 April 1950 English Heritage designated the hotel a Grade II listed building. The Grade II designation—the lowest of the three grades—is for buildings that are "nationally important and of special interest".

Architecture
The hotel is built of ashlar with slate roofs. The north and south wings have two regular storeys with a mansard roof, and dormers providing accommodation on the third floor. The central portion has three full storeys. The north wing, which faces along the Esplanade, curves almost a full 90 degrees, while the south wing is shorter, curving roughly 45 degrees. At the front of the building there is a porte-cochère (porch) supported by fluted Roman Doric columns.

See also
Listed buildings in Fleetwood

References
Notes
Footnotes

Bibliography

Further reading

External links

Commercial buildings completed in 1841
Buildings and structures in Fleetwood
Grade II listed buildings in Lancashire
Hotels in Lancashire
Decimus Burton buildings
1841 establishments in England
Hotels established in 1841
Hotel buildings completed in 1841